Swollen Members is a Canadian hip hop group from Vancouver, British Columbia, consisting mainly of Madchild and Prevail. Frequent collaborators include vocalist Moka Only (who was actually a member of the group for a short period of time in the mid-1990s when the group was formed, and then again from 2002 to 2005) along with the other former members Easy Roc & Zodak who were only in the group for a few years and producer Rob the Viking, an official group member since 2002. Swollen Members has released nine studio albums, one greatest hits album and 2 compilations, as well as numerous other singles. From 1996 to 2016, Swollen Members were the second best-selling Canadian hip hop artist in Canada (behind Drake) and were the best-selling Canadian hip hop group in Canada.

History

Foundation and single releases
Swollen Members was founded in 1990 by Vancouverites Madchild (Shane Bunting), Prevail (Kiley Hendriks), and Moka Only (Daniel Denton). Having begun a solo career while living in San Francisco, California, Madchild returned to Vancouver to work. There he met Prevail and Moka Only, who had been working together. He joined together. The group had to decide on a name and Moka Only suggested Swollen Members as a joke and it stuck.

The group began testing the international hip-hop waters by releasing four 12-inch vinyl singles on Madchild's own indie label Battleaxe Records initially distributed by New York-based Fat Beats; the singles sold approximately 10,000 copies each.

2001-2002: Second album and mainstream success
Following Balance, Swollen Members recorded and released Bad Dreams, released on November 13, 2001, and featuring guests such as Chali 2na of Jurassic 5, Son Doobie, Joey Chavez, and former member Moka Only. It appealed to both underground and mainstream audiences, reaching platinum status in Canada. The album earned Swollen Members their second Juno Award and four MuchMusic Video Awards including best rap video, best director and best independent video.

2002-2003: Monsters in the Closet
2002's Monsters In the Closet, their third release, brought official group membership for Moka Only and Rob The Viking to Swollen Members. Monsters in the Closet was a collection of B-sides and outtakes along with three new songs, "Breathe" which featured Portuguese Canadian pop singer, Nelly Furtado. Production credits include Evidence from Dilated Peoples. In January 2003, Swollen Members signed with Virgin Records.

2003-2004: Heavy
In 2003, the band released Heavy. In the same year the songs "All Night" and "Deep End (Utah Saints Remix)" were featured in the videogame SSX3. In 2004, the Swollen Members song "The Bottom Line" was featured in the video games WWE Day of Reckoning and WWE SmackDown! vs. Raw.

2005-2006: Black Magic
In 2005, Moka Only decided to break off from the group for a second time and continue work on his solo career. The following year, Swollen Members released their fifth full album, Black Magic. It is understood that Madchild and Prevail made an attempt to return to their previously critically acclaimed style and method. Their previous album Heavy was unlisted on their official site discography. A single from the album, "Put Me On (feat. Everlast)", was released in August 2006. Later that year, Nettwerk Management dropped the group due to Madchild's affiliation with the Hell's Angels.

2009-2010: Armed to the Teeth
Armed to the Teeth was released October 27, 2009 through Kottonmouth Kings label Suburban Noize Records. Featured artists on the album include La Coka Nostra, Talib Kweli, Tech N9ne, Tre Nyce, and a return of Moka Only on the previously released track, "Red Dragon". This release was followed by a North American tour with Australian Hip-Hop group Bliss 'n' Eso.

2011-2012: Dagger Mouth
Swollen Members scheduled the release of a studio album, Dagger Mouth, for April 2011, under Suburban Noize. Its first single is "Mr. Impossible". The second single released off Dagger Mouth is "Bring Me Down" which features rapper Saigon. A compilation album titled Monsters 2 was released August 2, 2011.

2013: Beautiful Death Machine
On March 19, 2013, their ninth studio album, Beautiful Death Machine was released, and had debuted at number 3 on the Canadian Albums Chart, making it the group's highest charting album in Canada to date.

2014: Brand New Day
June 17, 2014 brought their tenth studio album Brand New Day to store shelves across the world.
In mid-February 2015, Madchild was listed on the King of the Dot BO5 card against the battle rapper by the stage name of Daylyt. Footage of his trailer for this event can be found on the KOTD Entertainment channel on YouTube. The footage of the battle can be seen on the KOTD YouTube channel.

In 2018, The single Bank Job was released on all platforms followed by several solo projects by Madchild and XL The Band. After a long awaited hiatus, Swollen returned with the single 'Tetris' featuring Neph accompanied by a music video with dropped on YouTube in 2021.

Group members

Current members
Madchild – (1996–?; now solo)
Prevail – (1992–?; now part of XL The Band with Rob the Viking)
Rob the Viking – (2002–forever in the infinite universe; now part of XL The Band with Prevail)
Former members
Moka Only – (1992–1996, 2002–2005)
Easy Roc – (1995–1998)
Zodak – (1995–1999)

Discography

Studio albums

Compilations

Singles

Guest appearances

Music videos

Awards and recognition

Juno Awards
2007 – Rap Recording of the Year (Black Magic)
2003 – Rap Recording of the Year (Monsters In The Closet)
2002 – Best Rap Recording (Bad Dreams)
2001 – Best Rap Recording (Balance)

MuchMusic Video Awards
2003 – MuchVIBE Best Rap Video ("Breathe" feat. Nelly Furtado and directed by Todd McFarlane)
2002 – MuchVIBE Best Rap Video ("Fuel Injected" feat. Moka Only and directed by Wendy Morgan)
2002 – MuchMusic Best Director ("Fuel Injected" feat. Moka Only and directed by Wendy Morgan)
2002 – MuchMusic VideoFACT Award ("Fuel Injected" feat. Moka Only and directed by Wendy Morgan)
2002 – MuchMusic Best Independent Video ("Fuel Injected" feat. Moka Only and directed by Wendy Morgan)

Western Canadian Music Awards
2011 – Western Canadian Music Awards Outstanding Rap/Hip Hop Recording ("Dagger Mouth")
2004 – Western Canadian Music Awards Outstanding Rap/Hip Hop Recording ("Heavy")
2003 – Western Canadian Music Awards Outstanding Rap/Hip Hop Recording ("Monsters In The Closet")
2003 – Western Canadian Music Awards Outstanding Video ("Breathe" feat. Nelly Furtado)

Additional awards
2003 – COCA Campus Entertainment Awards Entertainer of the Year
2002 – Canadian Radio Music Awards Breakthrough Artist ("Fuel Injected" feat. Moka Only)
2002 – West Coast Music Awards Best Urban Release (Bad Dreams)
2002 – The Georgia Straight Readers Choice Best Urban Act

See also

Canadian hip hop
Music of Canada
List of songs recorded by Swollen Members

References

External links
 

Musical groups established in 1990
Musical groups from Vancouver
Canadian hip hop groups
Juno Award for Rap Recording of the Year winners
1990 establishments in British Columbia